Anthony Roche (born 17 August 1976) is an Australian retired footballer.

He played for Brisbane Strikers in the National Soccer League, scoring 12 goals in 21 games.

That attracted the interest of Fortuna Dusseldorf and signed for the then-Oberliga Nordrhein club from the Strikers. He failed to make an impact in Germany, despite coach Massimo Morales's hopes for his "killer instinct" in front of goal.

He then joined English side and Yeovil Town in League Two, but failed to make an appearance.

References 

Australian soccer players
Brisbane Strikers FC players
Association football forwards
Yeovil Town F.C. players
Fortuna Düsseldorf players